Jalan Tun Sardon (Penang State Road P14) is a major road in Penang, Malaysia. Connecting Balik Pulau in the west until Paya Terubong in the east. It was named after the former Penang's state Yang di-Pertua Negeri (Governor), Tun Sardon Jubir.

Route background
The Kilometre Zero (KM0) of the road starts at Paya Terubong junctions.

Anjung Indah, a sunset hotspot.

At most sections, Jalan Tun Sardon was built under the JKR R5 road standard, allowing maximum speed limit of up to 80 km/h.

List of junctions

References 

Roads in Penang